Ford Capri was a name used by the Ford Motor Company for three different automobile models:
 Ford Consul Capri, a coupé produced by Ford of Britain between 1961 and 1964
 Ford Capri, a coupé produced by Ford of Europe from 1969 to 1986
 Ford Capri (Australia), a convertible car produced by the Ford Motor Company of Australia from 1989 to 1994 and also sold in the US as a Mercury Capri from 1991 to 1994

The Capri name was also used by Ford's Lincoln-Mercury Division on various models which did not bear the Ford name, but were nonetheless Ford built products:
 Lincoln Cosmopolitan Capri, produced from 1950 to 1951
 Lincoln Capri, produced from 1952 to 1959
 Mercury Comet Capri, produced from 1966 to 1967
 Mercury Capri, produced in three generations from 1970 to 1978, 1979 to 1986 and 1991 to 1994

Disambiguation pages